Hilger is an unincorporated community in Fannin County, Texas, United States.

Notes

Unincorporated communities in Fannin County, Texas
Unincorporated communities in Texas